Dipaenae is a genus of moths in the subfamily Arctiinae. The genus was erected by Francis Walker in 1854.

Species
 Dipaenae contenta
 Dipaenae eucera
 Dipaenae ferruginosa
 Dipaenae incontenta
 Dipaenae moesta
 Dipaenae romani
 Dipaenae salcedo
 Dipaenae zygaenoides

References

External links

Lithosiini
Moth genera